Southern Pacific Railroad's AC-4 (meaning Articulated Consolidation) class of steam locomotives was the first class of 4-8-8-2 cab forward locomotives.  They were intended to improve on the railroad's MC (Mallet-Consolidation) class 2-8-8-2 locomotives with a larger firebox, hence, the four-wheel leading truck (instead of the two-wheel).

The AC-4s were the first SP Mallets built for simple expansion.

The AC-4s were removed from service starting in 1953, and all ten were scrapped by June 1955.

References 
 

AC-04
4-8-8-2 locomotives
Baldwin locomotives
Simple articulated locomotives
Railway locomotives introduced in 1928
Steam locomotives of the United States
Scrapped locomotives
Standard gauge locomotives of the United States

Freight locomotives 
Cab forward steam locomotives